Abdul Gani Vakil is an Indian politician and vice-chairman of Jammu and Kashmir People's Conference. He has served the state as Minister for Social Welfare.

Political career
Abdul Gani Vakil was active in social work from his college life and he started his political career in 1972. He got mandate from National Conference in 1977 to contest the assembly election but due to accord of Sheikh Abdullah and Indira Gandhi he withdrew his nomination. He preferred to go with a national party and later joined the Indian National Congress. He contested his first election in 1983 on Congress Party ticket and Indira Gandhi as a Prime Minister campaigned for him. In 1998 he contested his Parliamentary Election. He has also remained the member of All India Congress Committee and Chief Spokesperson of Jammu Kashmir Pradesh Congress Committee has served on Various Party Posts in Jammu Kashmir Pradesh Congress Committee. He served as General Secretary and Senior Vice President. Vakil represented India in Pakistan at the Pagwash Conference and has represented other countries, including Russia and Sri Lanka. He has served as Director of Silk Board, Government of India and later was also nominated as one of the Board of Directors of Ellaquai Dehati Bank by the Government of India.

He was the observer of UP Elections in 2012 and worked closely with Digvijay Singh who was in-charge of UP Elections. Later he was the political observer in Delhi Elections in 2015. He was the Star Campaigner for Ghulam Nabi Azad in 2014 in Parliamentary Elections. He was also given best legislator award in 2011.

On 19 July 2015, he announced his resignation from Congress in protest against the Party High Command for appointing Ghulam Ahmed Mir as President of the Jammu and Kashmir Pradesh Congress Committee. He termed the appointment of Mir as an arbitrary and undemocratic decision and blamed the congress party for ruining the party in the state. He was very close to Ghulam Nabi Azad in the Indian National Congress and he resigned after 40 years.

On 25 October 2017, he launched his own political party, 'Jammu Kashmir Bachao Tehreek'.

On 24 January 2019, he joined the Jammu & Kashmir Peoples Conference in the presence of Party Chairman Sajad Gani Lone.
 
On 22 February 2019, he was appointed as vice-chairman of the Jammu & Kashmir People’s Conference.
 
Sajad Lone, who was also spokesman of the Gupkar alliance, was under pressure from Abdul Gani Vakil over the electoral tie-up within the Gupkar alliance.
 
On 19 January 2021, Sajjad Lone's Peoples' Conference decided to exit the Gupkar Alliance over the fielding of proxy candidates by constituent parties against the officially mandated candidates of the alliance during DDC elections.

Personal life
Abdul Gani Vakil married Amina Wani in 1987, and they have two sons and a daughter.

References

External links
Daily Excelsior
 Indian Express
 My Neta
 Zee News

Living people
1952 births